My Lady Caprice is a 1907 romance novel by the British writer Jeffrey Farnol. A romantic drama set during the ongoing Edwardian era rather than the Regency period which he became best known for portraying, it was his debut novel. It was later republished under the alternative title Chronicles of the Imp, the title by which it had originally been serialised.

References

Bibliography
 Bryan, Pat. Farnol: The Man Who Wrote Best-Sellers. 2002.
 Vinson, James. Twentieth-Century Romance and Gothic Writers. Macmillan, 1982.

1907 British novels
Novels set in England
British romance novels
Novels by Jeffery Farnol
1907 debut novels